The 2009 Dutch National Track Championships were Dutch national Championship for track cycling. There were separate championships for endurance and sprint disciplines. The endurance disciplines (individual pursuit, scratch race, points race and madison) took place at Sportpaleis Alkmaar in Alkmaar, the Netherlands from October 9 to October 11. The sprint disciplines (sprint, time trial and keirin) took place from December 28 to December 30. Competitions were held of various track cycling disciplines in different age, gender and disability categories.

Medal summary

Elite

References

External links
Official event website

 
Dutch National track cycling championships
2009 in track cycling
Track cycling
Cycling in Alkmaar